Phuan or Northeastern Lao is a Tai language spoken in Laos, Thailand and Cambodia.

Distribution
The Phuan (Phouan) are a tribal Tai people originally inhabiting Xiangkhouang and parts of Houaphan provinces of Laos. As a result of slave raids and forced population transfers, there are small, scattered villages of Phuan in Sakon and Udon Thani provinces and another area around Bueang Kan, Nong Khai and Loei provinces in Thailand. Despite the small numbers and isolation, the Siamese kept the Phuan apart from the Lao, and in from other Thai people in Northern and Central Thailand were small communities of Phuan also exist, forcing them to live apart and dress in black clothing. The Phuan in turn practised endogamous marriage habits and steadfastness to their language and culture. It is distinct enough that Thais and Isan people generally consider it distinct, although Phuan is considered a Lao dialect in Laos. As a Tai language of northern Southeast Asia, it shares many similarities with Tai Dam and Tai Lan Na. In contrast to other minority languages of Isan, it is not losing ground to the Thai or Isan.

In Thailand, Phuan is spoken in Chachoengsao, Chaiyaphum, Lopburi, Nakhon Nayok, Phetchabun, Phichit, Prachinburi, Suphan Buri, and Saraburi provinces; it is also spoken in an isolated area of Bueng Kan Province, and in one village south of Bangkok

There are approximately 5,000 Phuan in Mongkol Borei District of Banteay Meanchey Province in Cambodia, as well in Battambang Province.

Phonology
Similar to Northern Lao, Phuan has maintained the Proto-Southwestern Tai distinction of Proto-Tai */aɰ/ and */aj/, but the outcome is /ɤː/ and /aj/, respectively, similar to the Northern Lao dialects of Houaphan which has a significant Phuan presence. Similar to the Phuthai (Phou Tai), final /k/ has been replaced by the glottal stop /ʔ/. What mainly distinguishes Phuan from all other Lao dialects are the vowel transformations that distinguish cognates, such as Lao /uːə/ appearing as Phuan /oː/ and Lao /ɨːə/ appearing as Phuan /iə/. This and a very distinct vocabulary make Phuan mutually intelligible but with difficulty to other Isan or Lao speakers and even harder to understand for native speakers of Central Thai.

Consonants
Phuan has the following consonant inventory:

Vowels
Phuan has the following vowel inventory:

Comparison with Lao, Isan and Thai

Vocabulary

Tones
Outside of Xiangkhouang and other native areas in Laos, the scattered Phuan settlements in Thailand have been greatly influenced by the tones of the local languages, however even though most maintain six, those in Louang Phrabang or Central Thailand only have five and when spoken as a second language by tribal peoples of various languages, they may use seven. However all Phuan dialects share distinct tonal split, with syllables beginning with low-clas consonants and marked with the mai ek (may ék) tone mark pronounced differently than similar situations with other class consonants. This is also done in some varieties of Western Lao. Most other Lao dialects have the same tone when marked with the mai ek tone mark.

References

Further reading
Burusphat, S., Sujaritlak Deepadung, S., Suraratdecha, N. A., Patpong, P., & Setapong, P. "Language Vitality and the Ethnic Tourism Development of the Lao Ethnic Groups in the Western Region of Thailand."

Southwestern Tai languages
Languages of Thailand
Languages of Laos